Richard Grosvenor Plunkett-Ernle-Erle-Drax (born 29 January 1958) is a British Conservative politician, journalist and landowner, serving as the Member of Parliament (MP) for South Dorset since 2010.

Early life
Drax was born on 29 January 1958 in Westminster, London, into a landowner family.  He was educated at Harrow School before going to the Royal Agricultural College in Cirencester where he graduated with a diploma in rural land management in 1990, receiving a further diploma in journalism in 1995.

Career

Military service
Drax passed out from the Royal Military Academy Sandhurst and was commissioned in the British Army joining the Coldstream Guards on 9 December 1978 as a second lieutenant. Drax was promoted lieutenant on 9 December 1980, before being transferred to the Regular Army Reserve of Officers after active service on 9 December 1983, ending his first period of full-time military service.

Drax was reinstated on the Active List on 10 September 1984, beginning his second and final period of regular service. He retained the rank of lieutenant with seniority from 10 September 1981 to reflect the three years he had served. He was promoted captain on 10 March 1986.

He relinquished his British Army commission on 9 September 1987, thereby retiring after nine years' service as a Coldstreamer.

Journalism
Drax worked at York's Evening Press as a reporter in 1991, before joining BBC South where he appeared on both radio and television media, including the daily television news programme South Today.

Parliamentary career
Selected as a Conservative prospective parliamentary candidate in July 2006, at the general election in May 2010 Drax defeated the incumbent Labour Member of Parliament for South Dorset, Jim Knight, later Lord Knight of Weymouth. Drax retained his seat in the 2015 general election with an increased majority and the 2017 general election.

On 5 February 2013, Drax voted in the House of Commons against a Second Reading of the Marriage (Same Sex Couples) Act 2013 that legalised marriage for same-sex couples.

In the House of Commons he has sat on the Environment, Food and Rural Affairs Committee and currently serves on the European Scrutiny Committee.

In 2009, Drax faced criticism from political rivals for 'hiding his aristocratic roots' by not using his full quadruple-barrelled name. It was suggested the then leader of the Conservative Party, David Cameron, had asked wealthy Conservative candidates to shorten their names to appear more in touch with normal people. Drax denied the accusations, saying that he used the shortened version of his name only because of the "logistic mouthful", while Cameron's comments were a "throw away joke".

Drax campaigned for Brexit during the 2016 referendum. In April 2019, in a speech in the House of Commons, Drax said that he "made the wrong call" by supporting the government's Brexit deal and called for the resignation of Theresa May if she failed to take the UK out of the EU by 12 April. Drax praised May's successor, Boris Johnson, for achieving a trade deal in December 2020, but in February 2021 expressed concern over the Northern Ireland Protocol and disruption to trade in Northern Ireland.

During the 2019 UK General Election Drax apologised after his Land Rover, with a campaign poster on the vehicle, was photographed parking across two disabled parking spaces outside his campaign headquarters. Drax responded to the incident by saying: "I popped in to get some literature and very thoughtlessly parked on those lines which I immediately regretted and apologise to the organisation straight away. I rushed in and rushed out. I've never done it before and never done it since but it was a real moment of thoughtlessness and it won't happen again."

In June 2020, Drax wrote an article in the Dorset Echo suggesting that rioters linked to the Black Lives Matter protests had been responsible for desecrating The Cenotaph war memorial in London.

In May 2022, Drax criticised the decision by Chancellor of the Exchequer Rishi Sunak to introduce a windfall tax on oil and gas firms to fund economic support for the public during the cost of living crisis, accusing him of "throwing red meat to socialists".

Drax endorsed Suella Braverman during the July 2022 Conservative Party leadership election. After Braverman was eliminated, he supported Liz Truss.

He endorsed Boris Johnson in the October 2022 Conservative Party leadership election.

Family

Drax lives in his family's ancestral seat, Charborough House – a Grade I listed manor house in rural Dorset. He also owns the  Ellerton Abbey farming estate in Swaledale, North Yorkshire, and the nearby  Copperthwaite Allotment grouse moor.

Drax is the eldest son of Henry Walter Plunkett-Ernle-Erle-Drax (1928–2017)  and The Hon. Pamela Weeks (1931–2019) and a grandson of Admiral The Hon. Sir Reginald Drax, younger son of the 17th Lord Dunsany thereby being in remainder to the ancient Barony of Dunsany (cr. 1462): the second oldest title in the Peerage of Ireland. His great-uncle was the celebrated writer and playwright the 18th Lord Dunsany, and his maternal grandfather was General the Lord Weeks.

His first wife (divorced 1997) was Zara Legge-Bourke, younger sister of the royal nanny Tiggy Legge-Bourke, relations of the Earl of Dartmouth. Drax married his second wife; Eliza, daughter of Commander James Dugdale RN (related to David Cameron) in 1998. Drax since married his third wife, Norwegian-born Elsebet Bødtker, and has four children in total.

At least six of his ancestors, including John Samuel Wanley Sawbridge Erle-Drax and the 17th Lord Dunsany, were Members of Parliament for Dorset and Gloucestershire between the 1680s and 1880s. A cousin is the 19th and present Lord Dunsany.

Family links to historical slavery
A 2020 investigation by The Guardian found that Richard Drax still owns and grows sugar on the same Drax Hall Estate in Barbados that made the family's fortune. Over 200 years, 30,000 slaves died at this and the other Drax plantations, according to Professor Sir Hilary Beckles, Chair of CARICOM's Reparations Commission. "The Drax family has done more harm and violence to the black people of Barbados than any other", he said. 

The Barbados Government is seeking reparations from Drax for his ancestors' involvement in slavery. The Reparations Commission wants Drax Hall to be returned to Barbados, to be made into a museum. If this request is refused, the government intends to take the matter to an international arbitration court.

See also 
 Baron of Dunsany
 Baron Plunket

References

External links

 Drax's Conservative Party Profile
 Dorset Life
 

1958 births
Living people
People educated at Harrow School
Nobility of the United Kingdom
Coldstream Guards officers
Conservative Party (UK) MPs for English constituencies
Ernle family
UK MPs 2010–2015
UK MPs 2015–2017
UK MPs 2017–2019
UK MPs 2019–present
Members of the Parliament of the United Kingdom for constituencies in Dorset
Richard
British Eurosceptics
21st-century British politicians